Several Kamehameha statues honor the monarch who founded the Kingdom of Hawaii.

Original work

The pictured statue stands  prominently in front of Aliiolani Hale in Honolulu, Hawaii. The statue had its origins in 1878 when Walter M. Gibson, a member of the Hawaiian government at the time, wanted to commemorate the 100-year arrival of Captain Cook to the Hawaiian Islands. The legislature appropriated $10,000 for the project and made Gibson the director of the project, which originally included native Hawaiians but they soon were off the project and Gibson ran the project by himself. Gibson contacted Thomas R. Gould, a Boston sculptor living abroad in Florence, Italy to create the statue.

Features
Even though photographs of Polynesians had been sent to him so that Gould could make an appropriate likeness, he seemed to ignore them. A Roman nose and more European features were adopted. This is most likely due to the fact that Gould was in Italy studying Roman sculpture. The stance of a Roman general with gesturing hand, spear, and cape are also Roman appropriations. The belt or sash on the statue's waist is a symbolic rendering of the Sacred Sash of Liloa. In 1880, the initial sculpture was sent to Paris, France, to be cast in bronze.

However, historians have noted that from the photographs that were sent to Gould, certain features of the statues were influenced by Hawaiian brothers John Tamatoa Baker and Robert Hoapili Baker. Two photographs of the former survive, one in its original form and another in the form composite with the bare legs of a Hawaiian fisherman.

During this time, David Kalākaua became king and was completing ʻIolani Palace which was his tribute to King Kamehameha I and to be the destination of the statue. The statue was too late for the 100th anniversary, but in 1883, the statue was placed aboard a ship and headed for Hawaii. Near the Falkland Islands the ship wrecked and the statue was thought lost. However, the Hawaiians had insured the statue for $12,000 and a second casting was quickly made.

Replicas

Before the second statue could be sent, the original was recovered by some Falkland Islanders. They sold it to the Captain of the wrecked ship for $500, and the Captain then sold it to Gibson for $875. Now Hawaii has two statues. The original stands near the legendary king's birthplace in Kapaau in Kohala, on the island of Hawaii. The re-ordered one stands in front of Aliiolani Hale.

A third replica was commissioned when Hawaii attained statehood and was unveiled in 1969. It stood in the United States Capitol alongside the Father Damien Statue and was the heaviest statue in Statuary Hall, weighing 15,000 pounds. In 2008, shortly after Hawaii-born Barack Obama was nominated as the Democratic Party's candidate for the presidency, the statue was moved from a dark, back row of Statuary Hall to a prominent position in Emancipation Hall in the Capitol's new visitor center.

The Gould statue can be briefly seen in the opening credits of the original 1960s TV police drama Hawaii Five-O as well as the 2010 series reboot. The statue is also seen multiple times in a three-part series of Sanford and Son when the duo go on a vacation to Hawaii. The statue is seen on a pedestal outside the Hawaii Police Department Headquarters.

Big Island

Another Kamahameha statue resides on the island of Hawaii (known locally as the Big Island). It is stands near downtown Hilo at the north end of the Wailoa River State Recreation Area, where it enjoys a king's view of Hilo Bay. The  statue was sculpted by R. Sandrin at the Fracaro Foundry in Vicenza, Italy in 1963 but was not erected on this site and dedicated until June 1997. The statue was originally commissioned for $125,000 by the Princeville Corporation for their resort in Kauai. However, the people of Kauai did not want the statue erected there, as Kauai was never conquered by King Kamehameha I. Hilo, however, was one of the political centers of King Kamehameha I. Consequently, the Princeville Corporation donated the statue to the Big Island of Hawaii via the Kamehameha Schools Alumni Association, East Hawaii Chapter.

Kane work
The Grand Wailea Resort Hotel & Spa on Maui is the home of a fifth Kamehameha statue. Hawaiian artist, author and historian Herb Kawainui Kane created the nine-and-a-half-foot work, which presides over the entrance of the hotel, facing the porte cochere. It is purported to be the most lifelike representation of the great warrior king.

Las Vegas Statue
 
There was a sixth statue in Las Vegas, NV, along the Strip at the Hawaiian Marketplace. It was removed in January 2014 to make way for a Chili's. It was then moved to Springs Preserve where it became weathered by the harsh desert elements, deemed beyond repair, and disposed.

Kamehameha Day
Every year on or near the June 11 Kamehameha Day holiday, Kamehameha statues are ceremoniously draped in fresh lei fashioned in Hawaii. The event is celebrated in the United States Capitol with traditional hula performances.

Gallery

See also
 Kamehameha Statue (original cast)
 Kamehameha Statue (Honolulu cast)

Notes

References

External links

 Statuary Hall Kamehameha statue

1880 sculptures
Outdoor sculptures in Hawaii
Sculpture series
Symbols of Hawaii
Statues in Hawaii